Macon is a village of Wallonia and a district of the municipality of Momignies, located in the province of Hainaut, Belgium.

The town has approximately 500 people, and is about 10 miles west of Chimay, near the French border. Nearby lies the site where the first U.S. troops began to liberate Belgium during World War II. A memorial stands near Macon at the point where soldiers of the First Army crossed from France into Belgium. The town is centered on St. Jean the Baptist Church, and a Linden Tree, several centuries old, sits in the church square, and is supported by braces originally built in the 17th century by Monsieur DeCuir.

References
 Source: Lybaert, Leon, Rev, and DeCuir, Randy: Albert deCuire arrives in Louisiana, Published 1995. Chapter on Macon, Hainaut. From research by the late Rev. Leon Lybaert of Macon, Belgium.
 Source: Hainaut-Louisiana: http://www.oocities.org/bourbonstreet/8230/villages/Macon/macon.html

External links

 More information on the official site of the municipality: www.momignies.be
 More information on this historical site of the municipality: 

Former municipalities of Hainaut (province)